Valentiniana also known as Valentinianen(sis) is a titular see (diocese) of the Roman Catholic Church  in the province of Byzacena,  North Africa. Very little is known of the bishopric. The seat of the bishop is not identified and only three bishops are known.
Rogatianus attended the Council of Carthage (484), and then exiled by the Vandal King, Huneric  
Charles Richard Mulrooney (24 Feb 1959 appointed – 5 Aug 1989 died) 
Philip Pargeter (20 Nov 1989 appointed – )

References

Catholic titular sees in Africa